The midge is a very small, two-winged flying insect.

Midge may also refer to:

Military
 Folland Midge, a British subsonic light fighter aircraft
 HMQS Midge, an Australian torpedo launch in service from 1887 to 1912
 Canadair CL-89, a surveillance drone called Midge in UK service

People

Given name or nickname
 Midge Bosworth (born 1941), Australian former racing driver
 Toughie Brasuhn (1923–1971), American roller derby skater
 Marjorie Frances Bruford (1902–1958), British painter
 Midge Costanza (1932–2010), American politician
 Midge Decter (born 1927), American neoconservative journalist and author of various books
 Midge Didham (born 1945), New Zealand retired jockey
 Mildred Gillars (1900–1988), American broadcaster of Nazi propaganda during World War II
 Midge Gillies, British journalist and biographer
 Marjorie Gladman (born c. 1900), American amateur tennis player
 Midge Mackenzie (1938–2004), Dublin born writer and film maker
 Midge Marsden (born 1945), New Zealand blues and R&B guitarist, harmonica-player, and singer
 Midge Miller (1922–2009), American politician
 Marjorie Moreman (1902–1987), British gymnast
 Midge Potts, transgender political activist
 Margaret Purce (born 1995), American soccer player
 Marjorie Rendell (born 1947), American jurist and first lady of Pennsylvania
 Midge Richardson (1930-2012), American nun and educator turned author and editor of Seventeen magazine
 Midge Ure (born 1953), Scottish guitarist, singer and songwriter
 Midge Williams (1915–1952), African-American Swing Jazz vocalist during the 1930s and 1940s

Surname
 Tiffany Midge, Native American poet

Fictional characters 
 Midge (Barbie), a doll in the Barbie line
 Midge Klump, from Archie Comics
 Midge Carter, in the play I'm Not Rappaport and its adaptations
 Midge Maisel, in The Marvelous Mrs. Maisel, an American television series
 Midge Pinciotti, in That '70's Show, an American television series 
 Midge, a pet mouse in Mary, Mungo and Midge, a  British animated children's television series 
 Marge Simpson, from the TV series The Simpsons is nicknamed "Midge" apparently exclusively by Moe Szyslak

Other uses
 Midge Lake, Livingston Island, Antarctica
 Midge the Sea Lion (1985-2010), a resident of the Oklahoma City zoo
 Midge Linux, a Linux mini-distribution for routers
 Midge (HBC vessel), operated by the HBC in 1877, see Hudson's Bay Company vessels
 JC Midge, a kit car

See also
 Midget
 "Mij", an Iraqi otter featured in the book Ring of Bright Water

Lists of people by nickname